Robert Sutton, 1st Baron Lexinton (21 December 159413 October 1668) was a Royalist MP in 1625 and 1640.

Biography
In 1624 he was elected Knight of the Shire (MP) for Nottinghamshire and re-elected in April and November 1640. He was disabled as a Royalist from sitting in 1643.

He served Charles I of England during the English Civil War, making great monetary sacrifices for the royal cause, and in 1645 the king created him Baron Lexinton, this being a variant of the name of the Nottinghamshire village of Laxton. His estate suffered during the time of the Commonwealth, but some money was returned to him by Charles II of England.

He commissioned the building of the first Kelham Hall. He died on 13 October 1668 at the age of 74. There is a wall monument to him in Church of St. Michael and All Angels, Averham.

Family
He was the son of Sir William Sutton of Averham, Nottinghamshire,

Lord Lexinton married three times. 
On 14 April 1616, he married Elizabeth Manners, the sister of John Manners, 8th Earl of Rutland, who died childless.
His second wife was Anne Palmes, widow of Sir Thomas Browne, 2nd Baronet, who also died childless.
 On 21 February 1660, he married Mary St. Leger, by whom he had six children:
 Robert, 2nd Baron Lexington (1662–1723)
 Bridget, married John Darcy, only son of Conyers Darcy, 2nd Earl of Holderness and Lady Frances Howard
 Charles
 St. Leger (a son)
 Mary
 Anne (born a few days after her father's death)

Arms

References

1594 births
1668 deaths
Barons Lexinton
English MPs 1624–1625
English MPs 1640 (April)
English MPs 1640–1648